MAP3K7CL, is a human gene located on chromosome 21. It is a coding gene.

Interactions 

MAP3K7CL has been shown to interact with GPS2.

References

Further reading

External links